Émile Stern (28 April 1913 – 14 January 1997), best known under his artistic pseudonym Emil Stern, was a French composer, pianist and conductor of Romanian descent. He was born in Paris. Together with his writing partner Eddy Marnay they wrote one of the winning songs for the 1969 Eurovision Song Contest: "Un jour, un enfant", sung by Frida Boccara. He wrote the scores for Claude Berri's film Mazel Tov ou le Mariage.

Selected songs

Marie Laforêt 
 "Ivan, Boris et moi", lyrics by Eddy Marnay (1967)

External links
Emil Stern at Discography
EMILE STERN ORCHESTRA

1913 births
1997 deaths
Musicians from Paris
French songwriters
Male songwriters
French music arrangers
French male conductors (music)
French people of Romanian descent
20th-century French conductors (music)
Eurovision Song Contest winners
20th-century French male musicians